Amy S. Mullin is an American chemist and Professor at the University of Maryland. She is a Fellow of the American Physical Society, the American Association for the Advancement of Science and the Optical Society of America. Her research focuses on molecular dynamics.

Education
Amy S. Mullin has a B.A.in Chemistry from University of California, Santa Cruz (1985) and a Ph.D. in Physical Chemistry from the University of Colorado, Boulder (in 1991 with W. Carl Lineberger). She was an AAUW American Postdoctoral Fellow at Columbia University, working with George W. Flynn (1992–1994).

Research 
Mullin uses time-resolved laser spectroscopy to investigate how energy is used in chemical processes and molecular collisions. This includes: Transient spectroscopy of collisions, where molecules are excited to very high energy states with pulsed lasers, and studied with time-resolved high-resolution optical absorption in order to investigate the relationship between molecular structure and collision dynamics; driving chemical reactions with vibrational energy, where high-resolution optical probing is used to investigate how chemical reactions are affected by large amounts of vibrational energy of the reacting molecules at a quantum-state resolved level; and spinning molecules into reactive states, using ultrafast lasers to investigate molecules in the presence of strong fields applied in short pulses of time. Mullin developed a high power optical centrifuge to generate molecules in high rotational angular momentum states in order to investigate the chemistry and dynamics of rotationally activated molecules. The optical centrifuge work is primarily focused on studying "rotationally-induced dissociation and isomerization and the coupling of vibrational and rotational degrees of freedom in high energy states."

Awards
 Fellow of the Optical Society of America (2018)
 Creative Educator Award, College of Computer, Mathematical and Natural Science (2011)
 Fellow of the American Physical Society (2009)
 General Research Board Semester Award (2008) from the University of Maryland
 Elected Fellow of the American Association for the Advancement of Science (2006)
 Camille Dreyfus Teacher Scholar Award (1999)
 American Young Leader of the American Swiss Foundation (1998)
National Science Foundation CAREER Award (1996)
 Office of Naval Research Young Investigator Award (1996)
 Clare Boothe Luce Professorship (1994)
 American Association of University Women Postdoctoral Fellow (1993)
 Elected to Sigma Xi (1991)

References

External links
 

Living people
Year of birth missing (living people)
Place of birth missing (living people)
University of Maryland, College Park faculty
20th-century American chemists
21st-century American chemists
American women chemists
Fellows of the American Physical Society
University of California, Santa Cruz alumni
University of Colorado Boulder alumni
Fellows of Optica (society)
Fellows of the American Association for the Advancement of Science
American physical chemists
Women physical chemists
Women in optics
20th-century American women scientists
21st-century American women scientists